By administrative means (В административном порядке, "V administrativnom poryadke") was a term used in the Soviet Union when some actions which would normally require a court decision were left to the decision of executive bodies (administration). 

With respect to the imprisonment and deportation of individuals, this meant extrajudicial punishment.

See also

Special Council of the NKVD
NKVD Troika
Population transfer in the Soviet Union
101st kilometre

Soviet phraseology
Euphemisms
Extrajudicial killings